A mower is a machine designed to cut grass or crops or other plants growing close to the ground.

Mower or The Mower may also refer to:

Equipment
 Flail mower
 Lawn mower, a small mower
 Roller mower
 Rotary mower, a mower with a horizontally spinning blade

Art and entertainment
Mower (band), an American hardcore/punk jazz band
Mower (album), the band's 2003 debut album
"The Mower", a 1979 poem by Philip Larkin
The Mower (folk song), folk song listed as item 833 in the Roud Folk Song Index
The Mower's Song, a 1681 poem by Andrew Marvell
"The Mower," a 1970 poem by William Heyen

People
Barry Mower, American businessperson
Caryn Mower (born 1965), American professional wrestler  actress, and stuntwoman
Charles Mower (1875–1942), American yacht designer and author
Eric Mower (born 1944), American marketing executive
Jack Mower (1890–1965), American film actor
John Edward Mower (1815–1879), member of Minnesota territorial legislature
Joseph A. Mower (1827–1870), Union general during the American Civil War
Liam Mower (born 1992), English actor and dancer
Morton Mower (born 1933), American cardiologist and the co-inventor of the automatic implantable cardioverter defibrillator

Places
 Mower, New Jersey, U.S.
 Mower County, Minnesota, U.S.

Other
 Mower (company), American marketing agency, originally named the Eric Mower and Associates
 23833 Mowers, a main belt asteroid
 Mower General Hospital, a U.S. Army Federal military hospital during the American Civil War
 USAT Sgt. Charles E. Mower, originally named the USS Tryon (APH-1)

See also
 Moa, nine species of extinct flightless birds
 Mowers (surname)

Occupational surnames